Boys Will Be Joys is a 1925 American short silent comedy film directed by Robert F. McGowan. It was the 41st Our Gang short subject released.

Cast

The Gang
 Joe Cobb as Joe
 Jackie Condon as Jackie
 Mickey Daniels as Mickey
 Johnny Downs as Johnny
 Allen Hoskins as Farina
 Mary Kornman as Mary
 Jannie Hoskins as Mango
 Pal the Dog as himself

Additional cast
 Gabe Saienz as Kid
 Jay R. Smith as Bit part
 Charles A. Bachman as Surveyor
 Allan Cavan as Member, Board of Directors
 George B. French as Member of Board of Directors
 William Gillespie as Member, Board of Directors
 William Orlamond as Member, Board of Directors
 Paul Weigel as Henry Mills, board chairman
 Charley Young as Member, Board of Directors
 Noah Young as Officer
 Andy Samuel as Unconfirmed

References

External links

1925 films
1925 comedy films
1925 short films
American silent short films
American black-and-white films
Films directed by Robert F. McGowan
Hal Roach Studios short films
Our Gang films
1920s American films
Silent American comedy films